The 1985 Asian Men's Softball Championship was an international softball tournament which featured nine nations which was held in Japan.

Participants

References

Asian Men's Softball Championship
International softball competitions hosted by Japan
1985 in Japanese sport